Beckenham is a suburb of Perth, Western Australia, located within the City of Gosnells.

History 
This suburb has seen many name changes. It was previously known as Buckingham, it once shared a "common usage" name of Waverley with East Cannington, and has one of the oldest and most well respected primary schools in Western Australia. The Canning River runs along the southwestern outskirts of Beckenham. In 2011 Beckenham released many new divisions of land.

See also 
 Beckenham railway station

References

External links

Suburbs of Perth, Western Australia
Suburbs in the City of Gosnells